Madhur Anand is a Canadian poet and professor of ecology and environmental sciences.  She was born in Thunder Bay, Ontario and lives in Guelph, Ontario.

Scientific Career 
Anand completed her PhD in theoretical ecology at Western University in 1997 and conducts research on ecological change and sustainability science.  Her topics of research include coupled human-environment systems and forest and forest-grassland mosaic ecosystems, and especially how sources of stress and disturbance, such as agriculture and climate change, impact these ecosystems across different spatial scales and time scales.  She uses simulation modelling, statistical tools, dendrochronology, and other observational methods.  She is a full professor in the School of Environmental Sciences at the University of Guelph where she leads the Global Ecological Change and Sustainability lab.

Anand has received awards including the Ontario Premier's Research Excellence Award and the Young Alumni Award of Merit from Western University.  She was also the Canada Research Chair in Global Ecological Change at the University of Guelph and, before that, the Canada Research Chair in Biocomplexity of the Environment at Laurentian University.

Interdisciplinary Initiatives 
She was director of the Waterloo Institute for Complexity and Innovation from 2015 to 2018, where she organized several interdisciplinary events such as Living on the Precipice: Interdisciplinary Conference on Resilience in Complex Natural and Human Systems and Poetry and Complexity, the latter featuring Nobel Laureate scientist and writer Roald Hoffman and Pulitzer Prize-winning poet Rae Armantrout. The event was covered in Rungh Magazine.

Literary Works 
Her poetry has appeared in literary magazines such as the Literary Review of Canada, The New Quarterly, The Malahat Review, Lemon Hound, The Rusty Toque, and The Walrus. Her work also appeared in the anthologies The Shape of Content: Creative Writing in Mathematics and Science and How a Poem Moves. She co-edited the first contemporary anthology of Canadian ecological poetry Regreen: New Canadian Ecological Poetry (Your Scrivener Press, 2009).

Her first collection of poems, A New Index for Predicting Catastrophes, was published by McClelland & Stewart in 2015 and was nominated for a Trillium Book Award for Poetry in 2016.  This collection challenges the reader to re-think ecopoetry and includes numerous examples of found poems derived from her own scientific papers.  The CBC named the book as one of ten all time “trailblazing” Canadian poetry collections.  

Her memoir This Red Line Goes Straight to Your Heart  won the Governor General's Award for English-language non-fiction at the 2020 Governor General's Awards. The work exemplifies the sub-genre of creative non-fiction and describes intra- and inter-generational perspectives on topics ranging from the Indian Partition to life as a young scientist.  The award jury noted how the memoir “blends science, personal narrative and fictional elements to push the non-fiction form into bold new territory”, while filmmaker Deepa Mehta writes that “... the different perspectives are truly poetic and at times heartbreaking”.

Her second book of poetry Parasitic Oscillations was published by Penguin Random House to international acclaim   and was the CBC Top Pick for Poetry in Spring 2022.

See also

Canadian literature
Canadian poetry
List of Canadian poets
List of Canadian writers

References

External links 
 

1971 births
Living people
University of Western Ontario alumni
Canadian women poets
People from Guelph
Writers from Thunder Bay
Governor General's Award-winning non-fiction writers
Canadian women non-fiction writers
Canadian memoirists
Canadian people of Indian descent
21st-century Canadian poets
21st-century Canadian women writers